The Cooper T73 is a 1.5-litre Formula One car, designed, developed and produced by Cooper Cars for the 1964 Formula One season.

Development
Bruce McLaren had persuaded Cooper to build a car, the T70, for the 1964 Tasman Series. It was based on the 1963 T66, and the T73 in turn was based on the T70. Consequently it still had a tubular steel chassis, but with additional stressed steel panels welded to the floor and sides. Front suspension was by double wishbones and inboard spring/dampers connected by rocker arms. At the rear there was a lower wishbone and a trailing arm connected to an upper link. The Tasman car had a small fuel tank for the shorter Tasman races, so the T73 had additional pannier tanks. As before, the Climax FWMV V8 supplied the power through a Cooper six-speed gearbox.

Racing history
The T73 was driven by Bruce McLaren and Phil Hill in 1964, debuting at the Monaco Grand Prix. McLaren's car broke a wishnbone in practice and he drove the previous year's T66 in the race, while Phil Hill retired with suspension failure. Thereafter, it was another season of disappointment, with McLaren's best results being second place in Belgium and Italy. He finished seventh in the World Championship. Hill had an even worse season, scoring a solitary one point and managing to crash both his T73 and the spare T66 in Austria, resulting in his temporary sacking by John Cooper, which resulted in him sitting out the Italian Grand Prix, replaced by John Love. The season ended with Cooper fifth in the Constructors' Championship.

McLaren and new teammate Jochen Rindt raced the T73 at the 1965 South African Grand Prix, after which it was replaced by the T77, although Rindt resorted to the spare T73 at the Italian Grand Prix when he bent a valve in his main car. One of the works cars was later sold to J.A. Pearce Engineering who fitted it with a Ferrari GTO 3-litre V12 and entered it in several races in 1966 and 1967 for Chris Lawrence. It was not particularly successful although it

A derivative hybrid version, called the T71/73, was a mix between the T73 and the Formula 2 T71 chassis, powered by a 1.5 litre Ford Twin-Cam engine and built by Bob Gerard Racing and entered in the British Grand Prix in 1964 and 1965.

Formula One World Championship results

Formula One Non-Championship results

References

Cooper Formula One cars
1960s cars
Cars of England